Giancarlo De Sisti (born 13 March 1943) is a retired Italian footballer and football manager and midfielder player.

Club career
Best known by his nickname Picchio, during his club career, De Sisti played for his hometown club A.S. Roma on two occasions (1960–65, 1974–79), and ACF Fiorentina (1965–74), winning several domestic and international titles with both clubs. He made his debut in Serie A with Roma in a 2–1 away defeat to Udinese, on 12 February 1961, in which he observed the team's star player and mentor Juan Alberto Schiaffino during his first spell at the club.  He enjoyed his most successful period with Fiorentina, which included a league title in 1969, the club's second overall, before returning to Roma in 1974. He won the Coppa Italia with both clubs, in 1964 and 1966.

International career

Internationally, De Sisti earned 29 caps and scored 4 goals for the Italy national football team between 1967 and 1972, making his debut on 1 November 1967, in a 5–0 home win over Cyprus in a UEFA Euro 1968 qualifying match. He later played in the European championship-winning team at Euro 1968 on home soil, appearing in the 2–0 final replay victory over Yugoslavia in Rome, at the age of 25. He was also a member of the Italian side that finished runners-up at the 1970 FIFA World Cup in Mexico.

Coaching career
Following his retirement, De Sisti pursued a coaching career, achieving his coaching badges in 1980, and becoming head coach of his former club Fiorentina later that year, narrowly missing out on the league title to rivals Juventus in 1982. He was forced to leave his job in 1985 after being diagnosed with brain abscess. He returned to football with Udinese later that year, for two seasons, and then entered into the Italian Football Federation as head coach of the Italian Juniores (1988–90) and Military squads (1990–91), winning a Military World Championship with the Italian Military side in 1991. He made a return to club football later that year, with Ascoli, being successively sacked in January 1992.

In March 2003—after over a decade of inactivity—De Sisti returned into coaching, joining Lazio as youth team coach. He left the job only a few months later, following the appointment of Roberto Mancini as new head coach of the biancazzurri.

Style of play
A creative and technically gifted deep-lying playmaking midfielder, who is regarded as one of Italy's and Roma's greatest ever playmakers, De Sisti was known for his simple yet efficient style of play; this involved him constantly looking for spaces, playing many short and accurate passes on the ground, and taking very few touches of the ball, in order to retain possession, reduce the chance of errors, and set his team's tempo. He was known for his composure under pressure and his consistency, and rarely misplaced passes or lost possession. He was also gifted with excellent vision and long passing ability, which allowed him to create goalscoring opportunities and play accurate lobbed passes and through-balls to team-mates.

Outside of football
On 3 July 1968, De Sisti founded the Italian Footballers' Association (AIC), in Milan, along with several fellow footballers, such as Giacomo Bulgarelli, Sandro Mazzola, Ernesto Castano, Gianni Rivera, and Giacomo Losi, as well as the recently retired Sergio Campana, also a lawyer, who was appointed president of the association.

De Sisti also later worked as a television and radio football pundit.

Career statistics

Club

Honours

Club
Roma
Inter-Cities Fairs Cup: 1960–61
Coppa Italia: 1963–64

Fiorentina
Serie A: 1968–69
Coppa Italia: 1965–66
Mitropa Cup: 1966

International
Italy
UEFA European Championship: 1968
FIFA World Cup Runner up: 1970

Individual
ACF Fiorentina Hall of Fame: 2013
A.S. Roma Hall of Fame: 2016

References

1943 births
Living people
Footballers from Rome
Serie A players
A.S. Roma players
ACF Fiorentina players
Italian footballers
Italy international footballers
UEFA Euro 1968 players
UEFA European Championship-winning players
1970 FIFA World Cup players
ACF Fiorentina managers
Udinese Calcio managers
Ascoli Calcio 1898 F.C. managers
Association football midfielders
Italian football managers